is a Japanese football player for Shimizu S-Pulse.

Career statistics

Club

References

External links

Profile at Shimizu S-Pulse

1993 births
Living people
Association football people from Tokyo
Japanese footballers
J1 League players
J2 League players
J3 League players
Shimizu S-Pulse players
Kataller Toyama players
J.League U-22 Selection players
Kashima Antlers players
Sagan Tosu players
Association football midfielders